The Fossa Eugeniana or Spanish Rhine-Maas canal  was a large-scale ambitious project of the Spanish-Dutch Eighty Years' War planned by the then Spanish regent in Brussels, Isabella Clara Eugenia, after whom it was named, during the years 1626–1630. It consisted of a fortified canal intended to blockade the United Provinces and to divert trade from the Rhine near Rheinberg just south of Wesel and reroute it to Venlo on the Maas, in Spanish territory. The Spanish Rhine-Maas canal had military importance, when at the time Spanish garrisons in north-western Germany reached their maximum extent, amounting to around fifty fortresses and forts. The Fossa Eugeniana was never finished. A 5.7 km section west of Geldern is in use as drainage canal. It is known under the name Grift.

Notes

References
Wilson, Peter Hamish. The Thirty Years War: Europe's Tragedy. Penguin, 2009. .
Israel, Jonathan Irvine. Conflicts of Empires: Spain, the Low Countries and the Struggle for World Supremacy, 1585-1713. London, 1997. .
Zijlmans, Roel. Troebele betrekkingen: Grens-, scheepvaart- en waterstaatskwesties in de Nederlanden tot 1800, chapter 5. Hilversum, 2017. .

External links
 http://www.kunstgeografie.nl/kanalen/fossa.start.htm  

Canals in Germany
Canals in the Netherlands
Canals in Limburg (Netherlands)
Landforms of North Rhine-Westphalia
Venlo
History of Limburg (Netherlands)